Grupo Manía (sometimes spelled Grupomanía or GrupoManía) is a popular merengue group from Puerto Rico.

History
Grupo Manía released its debut album in 1993. The group was formed by brothers Héctor and Oscar Serrano together with Edwin Serrano and Alfred Cotto in the early 1990s. In 1994, Edwin Serrano was replaced by Elvis Crespo before releasing their most successful albums.

In 1997, Crespo decided to leave the group and follow a solo career. He was replaced in 1998 with Reynaldo Santiago, who had previously sung with Zona Roja, another popular merengue band at the time. The band has achieved gold status with some of their albums and are considered one of the best in the genre.

At the beginning of the millennium, the band faced some controversy when Héctor “Banchy” Serrano, the group leader, fired Cotto and Santiago on the grounds of alleged discipline problems. Cotto and Santiago would go on to form Grupo Stars, while Serrano replaced them with Alex Rivera and Juan Luis Guzmán.

Despite never having the same amount of success as previous years, the band continued to perform and record albums. However, in 2006, Serrano announced the group would go on a reunion tour entitled "The Originals" with former members, Elvis Crespo and Alfred Cotto. After three years of inactivity, Grupo Mania released 15 Años de Corazon in late 2008.

The group continued releasing new and compilation albums, including: Se Pegó La Manía (2009), a live-recorded album Lo Que Le Gusta A Mi Gente (2011) and the band's 20th anniversary collection album Poderoso (2013). The latter was the last album to include performances by former members Oscar Serrano and Alfred Cotto.

In 2015, Oscar Serrano announced that he would leave the group to pursue a solo career. The decision caused a lot of controversy, since Serrano had been with the group since its beginning in 1992, and he had been considered the "heart and soul" of Grupo Mania.

Grupo Mania released the single "Te Vi", which only featured Banchy Serrano and Alfred Cotto as the only two remaining members of the group. The single received good criticism, since many fans thought the band seems to be getting back to what they have done before that made them successful. Later, Cotto, another original member (who had left the group years before and returned later), announced that he would also leave the group to pursue a solo career. Cotto stated that his decision to leave the group was based on agreements that the group's owner, Banchy Serrano, didn't comply with.

As the leader of the group, Banchy Serrano continued to recruit talent for Grupo Mania. In 2016, new members Rubiel Omar Barroso, Daniel Serrano (Banchy's brother) and Jhonny Vélez became the new voices of Grupo Mania alongside Banchy. The group released singles "Nena" and "Escápate" alongside former member Elvis Crespo as a way to promote the new era of the group. Later in November, the band released their 15th studio album La Marca, which included singles "Otro Loco", "Te Vi" (a different version from the original one that featured Alfred Cotto) and "Escápate". The album also featured the first time that neither Oscar Serrano or Alfred Cotto appeared on a Grupo Mania studio album.

On January 4, 2018, former member Jhonny Vélez announced on his Facebook page that he has been dismissed from the band. Vélez stated that he received a phone call from the group's manager, Alexis Vázquez, and the group's owner himself, Banchy Serrano, indicating him that they will no longer need his professional services. Vélez also stated that he "doesn't know the reason yet" for his dismissal and that he always gave 200% of his effort, while also thanking Grupo Mania for giving him a chance to belong to their group and the fans for all the love shown.

Later in January 2018, Grupo Mania announced the arrival of new member, Emanuelle Vizcarrondo to complete the four-men group after the dismissal of Jhonny Vélez. Vizcarrondo has been part of successful merengue groups such as Los Sabrosos del Merengue and Grupo Mambo.

The band was set to release their 16th studio album Los Conquistadores: 25 Aniversario on November 29, 2019. However, for unknown reasons, the album was not available in any digital platform, or at any store as a physical copy at the announced release date, despite the group's social media claim that is "available now". The group then announced on social media that they were having a "delay" because of the album's release date being on a Black Friday, and that they are expecting it to be available "at any time". Eventually, it was released on December 5, 2019, on digital platforms, such as Spotify and iTunes Store. The album includes recent successful singles, such as: "Tocaíto", "El Animal", and "Chorro Eh Loco", which features Puerto Rican rapper Ñejo, and Dominican singer Omega "El Fuerte".

On July 16, 2020, Grupo Manía released the official video of single "Get Low" on YouTube. The melody relies heavily on synthesizers and disco-like fusions, but without leaving behind the group's merengue essence. Banchy describes the song as a “trip back to the 70’s”, and “something that gets us out of our comfort zone as a group”. The song also appears to feature a sample of Flo Rida’s "Low" during the chorus. It was produced by Henry Jiménez.

During October 2020, the group released the single "La Nena", along with the official video. The band held a virtual concert on October 31, 2020, celebrating its 27th anniversary. The show was recorded in Parque De Las Ciencias in the city of Bayamón, Puerto Rico. Banchy Serrano stated that the group has suffered from not having enough live presentations in 2020 because of the COVID-19 pandemic. The band will work on their next album, as Grupo Manía -being a Tropical group- are more subject to increase their fandom from live presentations and album/single releases, as opposed to online streams.

On March 10, 2021, Grupo Manía released the single "Hula Hoop", which they were previewing since Summer 2020. Mere days after the release, Serrano announced that former member, Rubiel Barroso had decided leave the group due to personal reasons. On March 15, 2021, the band welcomed new member Raúl Armando Del Valle. Del Valle, previously  known as "Raúl Armando: El Fantástico", and as "El Rau", was part of successful merengue groups, such as: Karis, Ri-K Swing, as well as being a soloist.

Discography
 A Bombazo... Sí! (1993)
 Explotó el Bombazo (1994)
 Dance Manía (1995)
 Está de Moda (1996)
 Alto Honor (1997)
 The Dynasty (1998)
 Masters of the Stage (1999)
 2050 (2001)
 Latino (2002)
 Hombres de Honor (2003)
 La Hora de la Verdad (2005)
  15 años de corazón (2008)
 Se Pegó la Manía (2009)
 Poderoso (2013)
 La Marca (2016)
 Los Conquistadores: 25 Aniversario (2019)

References

Discogs Website / Grupo Manía
Official Artist Website
iTunes Website / Grupo Manía

External links
 Official Website
 +Google
 Grupo Mania on Facebook
 Grupo Mania on Twitter

Latin American music
Merengue music groups
Puerto Rican musical groups
Grammy Award winners
Universal Music Latino artists
Sony Discos artists